San Salvador Airport , also known as Cockburn Town Airport, is an airport in San Salvador, Bahamas.

Overview
San Salvador International Airport is one of the few airports in the Bahamas that has Instrument rating landing for aeroplanes, and as a result aircraft can now land at ZSA after official sunset (with local civil aviation permission). Bahamas Customs and Immigration is present at ZSA between normal working hours of 9am-5pm. The main carrier at ZSA is the national flag carrier Bahamasair, which has daily flights to and from Nassau. Club Med, a major hotel on the island, also has charter jet service flights direct from Paris, Montreal and Miami.

Airlines and destinations

Accidents and incidents
On 2 March 1973, Douglas C-47 N6574 of Arute International Air overran the runway on landing and was damaged beyond economic repair. The cause was pilot error in that a downwind landing was made. The aircraft was operating an international non-scheduled passenger flight from Miami International Airport, United States.

References

Airports in the Bahamas